Kings of Comedy Juniors is a 2017-2018 Indian Tamil language children stand-up comedy reality television show, which airs on Vijay TV. The first season of the show began airing on 8 April 2017, and ended 17 September 2017 after airing 49 episodes. That aired every Saturday and Sunday on June 24, 2017, The judges are comedy actor Robo Shankar, actress Rambha and Sindhu.  

The second season of the show started from 28 July 2018 and 24 November 2018 airs every Saturday and Sunday  The judges are actors Robo Shankar and Vani Bhojan, and TV anchor Erode Mahesh.

Seasons overview

Season 1

Winners

Finalist
 Muhesh
 Mridulasree
 Suchil
 Uthra
 Hrithikhasan
 Adhesh
 gowthamraj
 sivabalan

Cast

Host
 Priyanka

Judges
 Robo Shankar
 Rambha
 Sindhu

Season 2

Host
 Priyanka

Judges
 Vani Bhojan
 Robo Shankar
 Erode Mahesh

Winners

Finalist
 Hemapriya
 Santhoshi
 Monish
 Tharun
 Vishwa
 Keerthana

References

External links
Vijay TV Official Website on Hotstar

Star Vijay original programming
Tamil-language children's television series
Tamil-language reality television series
Tamil-language stand-up comedy television series
2017 Tamil-language television series debuts
2017 Tamil-language television seasons
Tamil-language television shows
2017 Tamil-language television series endings
2018 Tamil-language television seasons
2018 Tamil-language television series debuts
2018 Tamil-language television series endings